
This is a list of aircraft in alphabetical order beginning with 'Sa'.

Sa

Saab 
(Svenska Aeroplan AktieBolaget)
 Saab 17
 Saab 18
 Saab 19
 Saab 21
 Saab 21R
 Saab 24
 Saab 29 Tunnan
 Saab 32 Lansen
 Saab 35 Draken
 Saab 36
 Saab 37 Viggen
 Saab 38
 Saab 39 Gripen
 Saab 90 Scandia
 Saab 91 Safir
 Saab 105
 Saab 201
 Saab 202
 Saab 210
 Saab 340
 Saab 340 AEW&C
 Saab 1071
 Saab 1073
 Saab 2000
 Saab 2000 AEW&C
 Saab Safari
 Saab B3LA
 Saab J51
 Saab LX

Saarbrücken
 Saarbrücken Sportflugzeug

SAB
(Société et Ateliers Béchereau)
See:Béchereau

SAB
(Société Aérienne Bordelaise)
 SAB-SEMA 10 (Societé Aérienne Bordelaise – Societé d'Etudes de Materiel d'Aviation)
 SAB-SEMA 12 (Societé Aérienne Bordelaise – Societé d'Etudes de Materiel d'Aviation)
 SAB AB-20
 SAB AB-21
 SAB AB-22
 SAB AB-80
 SAB DB-71
 SAB DB-80
 SAB DB-81
 SAB LH-70 (a.k.a. Lorraine Hanriot LH-70)
 SAB turret bomber (at least two built / converted with VERY large turrets)

SAB Aviation
(SAB Aviation srl, Benevento, Italy)
SAB C-100 Vulcan

 Sabath 
(Joseph Sabath, Philadelphia, PA)
 Sabath 1932 helicoplane

 SABCA 
(Société Anonyme Belge de Constructions Aéronautiques)
 Sabca Demonty-Poncelot Cyrano
 SABCA Demonty-Poncelet limousine
 SABCA-Jullien SJ.1 – motorglider
 SABCA-Cambier monoplane
 SABCA CG-2 Camgul – 1925 single-engine biplane (Cambier-Guldentops)
 SABCA S.2 – 1926 single-engine airliner
 SABCA S.11 – 1931 trimotor airliner
 SABCA S.12 – 1931 trimotor airliner
 Sabca S.20 Libelulle
 SABCA S.30 – 1936
 SABCA S.40 – 1939 trainer
 SABCA S.45 – licence-built Caproni Ca.135
 SABCA S.46 – licence-built Caproni Ca.310
 SABCA S.47 – licence-built Caproni Ca.335
 SABCA S.48 – licence-built Caproni Ca.312
 SABCA S.50
 SABCA S.60
 Poncelet Vivette
 Poncelet Castar

 Sabey 
(Richard Sabey, CA)
 Sabey SX-1

Sablatnig
(Germany)
 Sablatnig B.I
 Sablatnig C.I
 Sablatnig C.II
 Sablatnig C.III
 Sablatnig C type experimental
 Sablatnig K.E.1
 Sablatnig N.I
 Sablatnig P.I
 Sablatnig P.II
 Sablatnig P.III
 Sablatnig SF-1
 Sablatnig SF-2
 Sablatnig SF-3
 Sablatnig SF-4
 Sablatnig SF-4Dr
 Sablatnig SF-5
 Sablatnig SF-6
 Sablatnig SF-7
 Sablatnig SF-8

 Sablier 
(Georges Sablier)
 Sablier S-4 
 Sablier T.4
 Sablier S-8
 Sablier S-10
 Sablier S-11
 Sablier S-12
 Sablier S-14
 Sablier S-16
 Sablier S-18
 Sablier S-19
 Sablier S-20
 Sablier S-23
 Sablier S-26
 Sablier-Phély helicopter

Sabre Aircraft
(Sabre Aircraft Inc, Buckeye, AZ)
Sabre 340
Sabre Aeros 503
Sabre Elite
Sabre Trike
Sabre Wildcat
Sabre Venture

Sabrewing Aircraft
 Sabrewing Rhaegal

 SAC 
(Southern Airmotive Corp, Dothan, AL)
 SAC Special

 Sack 
(Arthur Sack)
 Sack AS-5
 Sack AS-6

 Sackett 
(Horace E Sackett, Gobles, MI)
 Sackett J-1 Jeanie

 Saenger 
 Saenger I
 Saenger II

SADASA
(Servicios Aereos de America S.A.)
 SADASA Cuahtemoc M-1

 Sadler 
(William) Sadler Aircraft Co, Scottsdale, AZ)
 Sadler A-22 Lasa
 Sadler Piranha
 Sadler Vampire
 Sadler UAV-19-50

 Sadleir 
( Sadleir / VTOL Industries Australia Ltd.)
 Sadleir Sa-7

SAF
(Société Aéronautique Française, formerly Constructions Aéronautiques E. Dewoitine and nationalized in 1936 as Société Nationale de Constructions Aéronautiques du Midi)
see:Dewoitine

Safari
 Safari 400
 Safari 500

SAFAT
(SAFAT Aviation Complex, Sudan)
 SAFAT 01
 SAFAT 02
 SAFAT 03

 Safe-Wings 
(Master Air Pilots Inc, Rockford, IL)
 Safe-Wings SW-1
 Safe-Wings SW-2

Sage
(Frederick Sage & Company, United Kingdom)
 Sage Type 1
 Sage Type 2
 Sage Type 3
 Sage Type 4

Sagita
 Sagita Sherpa

 Sagsetter 
(Clarence & Raymond Sagstetter, Wausau, WI)
 Sagstetter 1935 Monoplane

SAI
(Skandinavisk Aero Industri A/S, Denmark)
 SAI KZ I
 SAI KZ II
 SAI KZ III
 SAI KZ IV
 SAI KZ VI Air Taxi 
 SAI KZ VII
 SAI KZ VIII
 SAI KZ IX
 SAI KZ (IX) Ellehammer
 SAI KZ X
 SAI KZ XI crop duster
 SAI KZ G-I

 SAI 
(Società Aeronautica Italiana, Italy)
 Ambrosini SAI.1
 Ambrosini SAI.2
 Ambrosini SAI.2S
 Ambrosini SAI.3
 Ambrosini SAI.10
 Ambrosini SAI.11
 Ambrosini SAI.107
 Ambrosini SAI.207
 Ambrosini SAI.403 Dardo
 Ambrosini S.7
 Ambrosini S.1001 Grifo
 Ambrosini S.1002 Trasimeno
 Ambrosini SS.4
 Ambrosini Sagittario
 S.A.I G97 Spotter

SAI
(Supersonic Aerospace International)
 SAI Quiet Supersonic Transport

 Sailair 
(James T Robinson, 1723 W 29 Pl, Los Angeles, CA)
 Sailair Firefly
 Sailair JT-1

Sailplane Corporation of America
(United States)see also: Gus Briegleb
 Briegleb BG-6
 Briegleb BG-7
 Briegleb BG 12

 SAIMAN 
(Societa Anonima Industrie Mecchaniche Aeronautiche, Italy)
 SAIMAN 200
 SAIMAN 201
 SAIMAN 202
 SAIMAN 204
 SAIMAN 205
 SAIMAN C.4
 SAIMAN LB.2

 SAIRC 
 SAIRC Shahed 278

Saker
 Saker S-1

 Saito 
(Sotoichi Saito, Japan)
 Saito Saigai

 Sakamoto 
(Juichi Sakamoto, Japan)
 Sakamoto No.1
 Sakamoto No.2
 Sakamoto No.3
 Sakamoto No.4
 Sakamoto No.5
 Sakamoto No.6

 Salina-Hoffman 
(Louis E Salina & Earl Hoffman, Carnegie, PA)
 Salina-Hoffman Susie Bee

 Salis 
(Amicale Jean Baptiste Salis, France)
 Salis AJBS 10

 Salisbury 
(H.M. Salisbury, Walnut Grove, CA)
 Salisbury 1927 Biplane

Salmon
(Percy Salmon)
 Salmon Tandem Monoplane

Salmson
(Société des Moteurs Salmson / Compagnie Française d'Aviation – C.F.A., France)
 Salmson Sal. 1 A3
 Salmson 2
 Salmson 3
 Salmson 4
 Salmson 5
 Salmson 6
 Salmson 7
 Salmson D-1 Phrygane
 Salmson D-2 Phrygane
 Salmson D-3 Phryganet
 Salmson D-4 Phrygane Major
 Salmson D-6 CriCri
 Salmson D-7 CriCri Major
 Salmson D-21 Phrygane
 Salmson D-211 Phrygane
 Salmson D-57 Phryganet

Salmson-Béchereau
(France)
 Salmson-Béchereau SB-2
 Salmson-Béchereau SB-3
 Salmson-Béchereau SB-3bis
 Salmson-Béchereau SB-3ter
 Salmson-Béchereau SB-4
 Salmson-Béchereau SB-5
 Salmson-Béchereau SB-6
 Salmson-Béchereau SB-7

Salmson-Moineau
(France)
 Salmson-Moineau S.M.1 A3
 Salmson-Moineau S.M.2 S2

 Salvay-Stark 
(Salvay-Stark Aircraft, Buena Park, CA)
 Salvay-Stark Aircraft Skyhopper I (NB:aerofiles have these as Skyhopper 10 and Skyhopper 11, which is clearly an error caused by mixing Roman and Arabic numerals)
 Salvay-Stark Aircraft Skyhopper II (NB:aerofiles have these as Skyhopper 10 and Skyhopper 11, which is clearly an error caused by mixing Roman and Arabic numerals)

 Salzman 
((Joseph R) Salzman Aircraft Services, Detroit Airport, MI)
 Salzman SL-1

 Sam Aircraft 
 Sam Aircraft Sam LS

 Samad 
 Samad Q-Starling
 Samad eVTOL

 SAML 
(Società Aeronautica Meccanica Lombardia, Italy)
 SAML S.1
 SAML S.2

 Sampson 
(A M Sampson (also seen as Robert Henderson & Nate Carhart), Wahpeton, ND)
 Sampson B Special MSL-2
 Sampson Wildcat

Samson Motorworks
(Meadow Vista, CA)
Samson Switchblade

Samu-Geonczy
(Béla Samu & Geonczy)
 Samu-Geonczy SG-2 Kek Madar

Samu-Orosz-Hatházi
(Belá Samu, Jenö Orosz and Dániel Hatházi)
 Samu-Orosz-Hatházi SOH-1

SAN
(Société Aéronautique Normande, France)
 SAN-B
 SAN 01
 SAN 101
 SAN Jodel D.117
 SAN Jodel D.140 Mousquetaire
 SAN Jodel D.150 Mascaret

R,S & Associes SAS Erik Sanstroem
(Versailles, Yvelines, France)
Sanstroem Friendship 3

 San Francisco 
(San Francisco, CA)
 San Francisco R-1 a.k.a. Flier

 San Jose 
(San Jose Flying Club Ltd, 1232 Martin Ave, San Jose, CA)
 San Jose E

Sanchez-Besa
(Establissements Louis Clement el Sanchez-Besa)
 Sanchez-Besa Multiplane (1921) single-engine experimental

 Sanders 
(C Sanders, Oakland, CA)
 Sanders Curtiss Pursuit

Sands
(Ron Sands Co, Mertztown, PA)
Sands Fokker Dr.1 Triplane
Sands Replica 1929 Primary Glider

 Sänger 
(Eugen Sänger)
 Sänger Strato-Gleiter

 Santa Ana 
(Santa Ana Aircraft Co, Santa Ana, CA)
 Santa Ana 1925 Biplane
 Santa Ana VM-1

Santos-Dumont
(Alberto Santos-Dumont, France)
 
 Santos-Dumont helicopter
 Santos-Dumont 14-bis
 Santos-Dumont 19 Demoiselle
 Santos-Dumont 20 Demoiselle
 Santos-Dumont 21 Demoiselle
 Santos-Dumont 22 Demoiselle

 São Carlos 
(Escola de Engenharia de São Carlos(IPAI Aeronautical Division)- São Carlos Engineering School)
 IPAI-26 Tuca
 IPAI-27 Jipe Vaodor
 IPAI-28 Super Surubim
 IPAI-29 Tira Prosa
 IPAI-30

São Paulo
 São Paulo SP-18 Onça – Jaguar
 São Paulo SP-19 Galinha – Hen
 São Paulo SP-20 Pinto
 São Paulo SP-21 Ganço – Duck

Sapphire Aircraft Australia
(Fosterville, Victoria, Australia)
Sapphire Aircraft Australia Sapphire LSA

Sarić
 Sarić 1
 Sarić 2

 SATTCo 
(Service Aviation Training & Transport Co, Wabash, IN)
 SATTCo Commercial

 Saturn 
(Saturn Aircraft & Engineering, Oxnard, CA)
 Saturn Taylor Meteor II

 Saul 
((W Irving) Saul Aircraft Corp, Carroll, IA)
 Saul Triad 1000

Saulnier
(Société des Aéroplanes Saulnier, France)
 Saulnier monoplane
 Saulnier monoplane No.2

Saunders
(S.E Saunders Limited, United Kingdom)
 Saunders Helicogyre
 Saunders T.1
 Saunders Kittiwake
 Saunders A.3 Valkyrie
 Saunders A.4 Medina
 Saunders A.7 Severn
 Saunders A.10 "Multigun" – 1928
 Saunders A.14

 Saunders Aircraft Company 
(Canada)
 Saunders ST-27
 Saunders ST-28
 Saunders Cheetah
 Saunders Super Cheetah

 Saunders-Roe 
(United Kingdom)
 Saro A.7 Severn
 Saro A.17 Cutty Sark
 Saro A.19 Cloud
 Saro A.21 Windhover
 Saro A.22 Segrave Meteor
 Saro A.24 Mailplane
 Saro A.33
 Saunders-Roe SR.45 Princess
 Saunders-Roe SR.53 – mixed power interceptor
 Saunders-Roe SR.177 – mixed power interceptor (cancelled before completion)
 Saro Lerwick
 Saro London
 Saro-Percival Mailplane
 Saro Shrimp
 Saunders-Roe SR.A/1
 Saro P.531
 Saro W-14 Skeeter

Sauper
 Sauper J300 Joker
 Sauper Papango

Sauser Aircraft Company
(Tustin, CA)
Sauser P6E Replica

 Sauzeau 
 Sauzeau Eres-II Coquin Moulins

Savary
 Savary 1910
 Savary Hydroaéroplane

 Savyelyev-Zalewski 
(Vladimir Fedorovich Savyelyev & Władislaw Zalewski)
 S.Z. No.1 (a.k.a. Zalewski W.Z.III)
 S.Z. No.2 (a.k.a. Zalewski W.Z.IV)
 S.Z. No.3 (a.k.a. Zalewski W.Z.V)
 Savelyev No.4
 Savalyev 1916 Quadruplane
 Savalyev 1923 Quadruplane

 Savoia-Marchetti 
(SIAI-Marchetti - Société anonyme de construction aéronautique Savoia'', Italy)
 Savoia-Marchetti S.51
 Savoia-Marchetti S.52
 Savoia-Marchetti S.55
 Savoia-Marchetti S.56
 Savoia-Marchetti S.57
 Savoia-Marchetti S.58
 Savoia-Marchetti S.59
 Savoia-Marchetti S.62
 Savoia-Marchetti S.64
 Savoia-Marchetti S.65
 Savoia-Marchetti S.66
 Savoia-Marchetti S.67
 Savoia-Marchetti S.71
 Savoia-Marchetti S.72
 Savoia-Marchetti S.73
 Savoia-Marchetti S.74
 Savoia-Marchetti SM.75 Marsupiale
 Savoia-Marchetti SM.76
 Savoia-Marchetti SM.77
 Savoia-Marchetti S.78
 Savoia-Marchetti SM.79 Sparviero
 Savoia-Marchetti SM.80
 Savoia-Marchetti SM.81 Pipistrello
 Savoia-Marchetti SM.82 Canguru
 Savoia-Marchetti SM.83
 Savoia-Marchetti S.84
 Savoia-Marchetti SM.84
 Savoia-Marchetti SM.85
 Savoia-Marchetti SM.86
 Savoia-Marchetti SM.87
 Savoia-Marchetti SM.88
 Savoia-Marchetti SM.89
 Savoia-Marchetti SM.90
 Savoia-Marchetti SM.91
 Savoia-Marchetti SM.92
 Savoia-Marchetti SM.93
 Savoia-Marchetti SM.94( Company drawings)
 Savoia-Marchetti SM.95
 Savoia-Marchetti SM.105

Savoia Pomilio 
(Italy)
 Savoia-Pomilio SP.1
 Savoia-Pomilio SP.2
 Savoia-Pomilio SP.3
 Savoia-Pomilio SP.4

Sawyer 
(Hugh S Sawyer, Milwaukee, WI)
 Sawyer A

Sawyer 
(Ralph V Sawyer, Lancaster, California, United States)
 Sawyer Skyjacker II

Saynor & Bell 
(George Saynor and Robert Bell)
 Saynor & Bell Canadian Club

References

Further reading

External links

 List Of Aircraft (S)

de:Liste von Flugzeugtypen/N–S
fr:Liste des aéronefs (N-S)
nl:Lijst van vliegtuigtypes (N-S)
pt:Anexo:Lista de aviões (N-S)
ru:Список самолётов (N-S)
sv:Lista över flygplan/N-S
vi:Danh sách máy bay (N-S)